The 1927–28 Montreal Canadiens season was the team's 19th season, and 11th in the National Hockey League (NHL). The team improved from its second-place finish to place first in the Canadian Division and qualify for the playoffs. The Canadiens lost in a playoff rematch against the rival Maroons in a two-game total-goals series 3–2.

Regular season
Howie Morenz, the NHL's top drawing card, dominated the scoring race and was runaway winner of the Hart Trophy. He scored 33 goals and led the league in assists as well. The Canadiens, who were running away with the Canadian Division at mid-season, slumped after an injury to Pit Lepine but managed to hold on to first place at season's end.

Final standings

Record vs. opponents

Schedule and results

Playoffs
The Canadiens received a first-round bye and met the Maroons in the semi-finals. In a two-game, total goals series, the series was tied going into sudden-death overtime before Russell Oatman scored the winner at 8:20 to win the series 3–2 ( 2–2, 1–0) for the Maroons.

Player statistics

Regular season
Scoring

Goaltending

Playoffs
Scoring

Goaltending

Awards and records
 Hart Memorial Trophy – Howie Morenz

Transactions

See also
1927–28 NHL season

References
Notes

Bibliography

Montreal Canadiens seasons
Montreal
Montreal